Diadegma akoense is a wasp first described by Tokuichi Shiraki in 1917. No subspecies are listed.

References

akoense
Insects described in 1917